Kim Jeong-ho (pen name Gosanja; ‘the guy of old mountain’ 1804–1866?) was a Korean geographer and cartographer. He was born in Hwanghaedo. It is believed that he walked the entire length and breadth of the Korean peninsula, through mountain and valley, in order to research and compile his magnum opus, the Daedongyeojido, (대동여지도, 大東輿地圖) a map of Korea that was published in 1861, from which a single-sheet version, the Daedongyeojijeondo (대동여지전도 大東與地全圖), was subsequently made. 

The events surrounding Kim's death are obscure. Following the publication of a later version of the Daedongyeojido in 1866, Kim is not heard from again. The document from the Governor-General of Korea asserts that the Korean regent Daewongun, upon viewing the later version of Kim's great map, became incensed by its inclusion of details of a sensitive nature critical to national defense. According to the document, the Daewongun had Kim arrested and jailed and the maps had been destroyed.

However, the original wood printing block of Daedongyeojido can still be found in the Soongsil University and also in the Korea University, contradicting the Governor-General’s document. Furthermore, others who helped develop the map, such as Choe Han-gi and Shin Hun, were not convicted at all. The Korean historical community generally believe that the document was a fabrication by the General-Government, which was under control by Japan during the Japanese colonization of Korea.

The asteroid 95016 Kimjeongho is named in his honour.

Gallery

See also
 Geography of South Korea
 Geography of North Korea
 Kim's 1861 map held at the American Geographical Society Library, University of Wisconsin Milwaukee

References

Further reading
 Kane, Daniel C. (2003), “Martyr to a Map: the Inscrutable Father of Korean Cartography”. Mercator’s World, Vol. 8, No. 1 (January/February 2003).
 Cope, Angela (2009), "Korean National Treasure Identified in AGS Library." UWM Libraries Newsletter, Fall 2009, No. 56. 
 Ledyard, Gari (1994) "Cartography in Korea." The History of Cartography, Vol. 2, Book 2,  (Ledyard includes a good biography of Kim with description of his contribution to cartography in Korea and Asia).

Korean geographers
19th-century cartographers
1804 births
Gim clan of Cheongdo
1860s deaths
19th-century Korean scientists